Christie MacDonald (February 28, 1875 – July 25, 1962) was a Canadian-born American musical comedy actress and opera singer. She was perhaps best remembered as the Princess of Bozena in the 1910 operetta Spring Maid. The 1913 musical Sweethearts specifically was written for MacDonald by composer Victor Herbert. She retired from the stage after appearing in a 1920 revival of the musical comedy Florodora.

Early life
MacDonald was born in Pictou, Nova Scotia, the daughter of John MacClean MacDonald, a shipbuilder, mariner and inn-keeper in the coastal town of Pictou and Jessie (née MacKenzie).
When she was about nine her family relocated to Boston, Massachusetts where she attended Bowdoin and later Boston High School.

Career
MacDonald began in theatre in 1893 in New York when she was cast in Francis Wilson's popular play Erminie. She thereafter found success
in the operetta brand of musical theater. MacDonald's first starring role came in 1900 when she assumed the title role in the Kirke La Shelle and Julian Edwards comic opera The Princess Chic. MacDonald starred or co-starred in The Belle of Mayfair (1906) with Valeska Suratt, Miss Hook of Holland (1908) with Bertram Wallis and The Mikado (1910) with Fritzi Scheff. In 1910 she starred in one of her best-known musicals, The Spring Maid by Heinrich Reinhardt. Victor Herbert's Sweethearts (1913) was written especially for her.

MacDonald made several gramophone records before retiring in 1920. She was married first to William W. Jefferson, a son of the famous actor Joseph Jefferson, in 1901 and ended in divorce several years thereafter. In 1903 she conceived a child with prominent theatrical promoter and New York State Senator Timothy Sullivan, who was soon placed in the New York Foundling Hospital. MacDonald did not return to the stage until 1904.

In 1911 MacDonald married Henry L. Gillespie, the scion of a wealthy Pittsburgh contracting family and had one daughter, Christie. As of 1950 MacDonald was living with her daughter and grandchildren in Westport, Connecticut. Christie MacDonald died in Fairfield, Connecticut on July 25, 1962.

Selected musicals

 Erminie (1893)
 The Bride Elect (1898)
 The Toreador (1902)
 The Sho-Gun (1904)
 The Belle of Mayfair (1906)
 Miss Hook of Holland (1908)
 The Spring Maid (1910)
 The Mikado (1910) (revival)
 Sweethearts (1913)
 Florodora (1920) (revival)

References

External links

Christie MacDonald portrait NY Public Library Billy Rose Collection
Christie MacDonald portrait at the University of Louisville, Macauley Theatre Collection
Christie MacDonald recordings 1911, 1913
Collected Recordings of Christie MacDonald and Reinald Werrenrath
Complete Victor label discography of Christie MacDonald

1875 births
1962 deaths
People from Pictou County
Canadian emigrants to the United States
American musical theatre actresses
Musicians from Boston
Actresses from Boston
Singers from Massachusetts
19th-century American actresses
American stage actresses
19th-century American women opera singers
20th-century American actresses
20th-century American women opera singers